Ernst Immanuel Bekker (16 August 1827, in Berlin – 29 June 1916, in Heidelberg) was a German jurist and professor.

Life 
Bekker studied law at Heidelberg, where he was a member of the Corps Saxo-Borussia. In 1853 he gained his Habilitation at the Martin-Luther-Universität Halle-Wittenberg in Roman law. He was extraordinary professor there from 1855 until he was called to an ordinary professorship at Greifswald in 1857. In 1874 he finally returned to Heidelberg. In 1886, he became Pro-Rector of the University of Heidelberg, and became emeritus in 1908. He remained in Heidelberg until his death.

Besides work on Roman law Bekker principally wrote philosophical treatises and works on natural science.

Works 

 Die prozessualische Konsumption, 1853
 Von deutschen Hochschulen Allerlei: was da ist und was da sein sollte, 1869
 Die Aktionen des römischen Privatrechts, 1871–1873
 Das Recht des Besitzes bei den Römern, 1880
 System des heutigen Pandektenrechts, 1886–1889
 Recht muss recht bleiben, 1896
 Die Reform des Hypothekenwesens als Aufgabe des norddeutschen Bundes, Berlin 1867
 Das Völkerrecht der Zukunft, Heidelberg 1915.(Sitzungsberichte der Heidelberger Akademie der Wissenschaft - phil.-historische Klasse, 3)

References

Biographies 
 Dagmar Drüll: Heidelberger Gelehrtenlexikon 1803–1932. Springer, Berlin and elsewhere 1986, pp. 16–17.

External links 
 
 

Jurists from Baden-Württemberg
1827 births
1916 deaths
19th-century German jurists
20th-century German jurists